Franklin (also referred to as Franklin-Beachwood) is a census-designated place in Merced County, California, United States, sitting at an elevation of . As of the 2020 census the population was 6,919, up from 6,149 in 2010.

Franklin-Beachwood is administered by Merced County as one of its unincorporated urban communities.

Geography
Franklin is in east-central Merced County, bordered to the east by the city if Merced, te county seat. California State Route 99 forms the southern border of the community.

According to the United States Census Bureau, the Franklin CDP covers an area of 2.0 square miles (5.2 km), all of which is land.

Demographics
At the 2010 census Franklin had a population of 6,149. The racial makeup of Franklin was 3,455 (56.2%) White, 273 (4.4%) African American, 77 (1.3%) Native American, 931 (15.1%) Asian, 12 (0.2%) Pacific Islander, 1,072 (17.4%) from other races, and 329 (5.4%) from two or more races. Hispanic or Latino of any race were 3,250 persons (52.9%).

The census reported that 6,149 people (100% of the population) lived in households, none (0%) lived in non-institutionalized group quarters, and no one was institutionalized.

There were 1,680 households, 923 (54.9%) had children under the age of 18 living in them, 891 (53.0%) were opposite-sex married couples living together, 318 (18.9%) had a female householder with no husband present, 161 (9.6%) had a male householder with no wife present.  There were 131 (7.8%) unmarried opposite-sex partnerships, and 17 (1.0%) same-sex married couples or partnerships. 236 households (14.0%) were one person and 84 (5.0%) had someone living alone who was 65 or older. The average household size was 3.66.  There were 1,370 families (81.5% of households); the average family size was 4.05.

The age distribution was 2,164 people (35.2%) under the age of 18, 737 people (12.0%) aged 18 to 24, 1,553 people (25.3%) aged 25 to 44, 1,255 people (20.4%) aged 45 to 64, and 440 people (7.2%) who were 65 or older.  The median age was 27.0 years. For every 100 females, there were 100.2 males.  For every 100 females aged 18 and over, there were 96.8 males.

There were 1,907 housing units at an average density of 948.9 per square mile, of the occupied units 1,033 (61.5%) were owner-occupied and 647 (38.5%) were rented. The homeowner vacancy rate was 4.8%; the rental vacancy rate was 6.9%.  3,493 people (56.8% of the population) lived in owner-occupied housing units and 2,656 people (43.2%) lived in rental housing units.

References

Census-designated places in Merced County, California
Census-designated places in California